NCAA Football is an American football video game series developed by EA Sports in which players control and compete against current Division I FBS college teams. It served as a college football counterpart to the Madden NFL series. The series began in 1993 with the release of Bill Walsh College Football. EA eventually acquired the licensing rights to the NCAA name and officially rechristened the series with the release of NCAA Football 98.

In July 2013, the NCAA announced that it would not renew its licensing contract with Electronic Arts because of an ongoing legal dispute regarding the use of player likenesses in the games. However, this contract only covered the use of the NCAA name and related logos, not those of individual schools and conferences, which are negotiated individually or through the Collegiate Licensing Company. The CLC concurrently announced that it would extend its existing licensing deal with EA through 2017, ensuring that EA Sports could continue the series without the NCAA branding and EA made plans to continue the series under the old College Football name. However, the series was placed on hiatus in September 2013, following three major conferences pulling their trademark licenses from EA, and uncertainties surrounding the results of lawsuits involving the use of player likenesses in-game.

In February 2021, Electronic Arts announced that the series would be returning for next-gen platforms no earlier than summer 2023. During an interview with ESPN.com in November 2022, an EA Sports executive revealed that the game would be released in "the summer of 2024...because of the enormous undertaking of creating the game from scratch".

Yearly releases (1993–2014)

Bill Walsh College Football 

Bill Walsh College Football was released in June 1993 on 4th generation video game consoles, such as the Sega Genesis.

Bill Walsh College Football featured the top 24 college football teams from 1992 and 24 of the all-time greatest teams since 1978. While no actual players were named and no official team logos used, colleges were listed by city and players identified by number. Play modes include exhibition, playoffs, and all-time playoffs. Sixty-eight classic college plays were available, including the triple option, student body, and wishbone.

Other options and features include automatic or manual-pass catch mode, audible, reverse angle replay, onside kicks, four weather conditions (fair, windy, rain, and snow), three different quarter lengths (5, 10, and 15 minutes), and a hurry-up offense.

The Bill Walsh endorsement was meant to parallel John Madden's endorsement of Madden NFL; Walsh at the time was head coach of the Stanford Cardinal football team.

Bill Walsh College Football '95 was the second installment of the college football franchise and the first to have a year.

The game featured 36 Division I-A teams, a windowless passing mode, customizable seasons from one to sixteen weeks, and complete statistical tracking throughout the season. Players could choose either a playoff system or bowl games with fictional names: Maple Bowl, Palm Bowl, Pecan Bowl, and Redwood Bowl.

Bill Walsh College Football 95 also provided 36 new plays and formations including the Wishbone, Veer, Tee Offense, and 4-4 D.

College Football USA 96 

The series was renamed College Football USA 96, and was the first version to feature all (108 at the time) Division l-A teams. It was also the first in the series to feature real bowl games (Orange, Sugar, Fiesta, and Rose). Players could play an entire 11-game season (or shorter if desired) before advancing to one of the bowl games.

There were 400 plays from which to choose, and a new passing mode allowed players to select from five receivers on every play. Other new features and options included the following: four-player mode, three different game lengths, substitutions, injuries, audible, fake snaps, spins, hurdles, dives, blocked kicks, interceptions, and laterals

College Football USA 97 

College Football USA 97 was the fourth installment of the series. While the game was published for the Genesis by EA Sports as usual, the Super NES version was instead published by THQ. The game featured University of Nebraska quarterback Tommie Frazier on the cover.

NCAA Football 98 

NCAA Football 98 was released in 1997. The game featured University of Florida quarterback and Heisman Trophy winner Danny Wuerffel on the cover.

NCAA Football 99 

NCAA Football 99 was the sixth edition of the game. The game featured University of Michigan cornerback and Heisman Trophy winner Charles Woodson on the cover. Its tagline read Desire+Pride=Victory!.

The game featured all 112 Division I-A teams at the time and also featured 3D, polygon-rendered players for the first time in the franchise's history. Additional features included the ability to create players, edit player names, sixty fight songs and crowd chants. Over eighty historical teams were added to the game, as well. The Heisman Memorial Trophy replaces the 'EA Sports MVP" trophy and other awards are given out. Recruiting is simple and done in a serpentine draft system. The Rose Bowl, Cotton Bowl, Fiesta Bowl and Sugar Bowl are now playable, and the other Bowls played have EA Sports as the sponsor. Created players from this game can be imported to the title Madden NFL 99. It featured no commentary by booth announcers; instead a PA announcer provides the commentary. Unlike the current games in this franchise, NCAA 99 featured an optional 16 team playoff at the end of the season in dynasty mode.

NCAA Football 2000 

NCAA Football 2000, released only for the PlayStation, featured University of Texas running back and Heisman Trophy winner Ricky Williams on the cover.

The game included all 114 Division I-A schools and 26 from Division I-AA. It also featured new 3D polygon-rendered players, which are fully displayed in multiple camera angles during gameplay.

Other notable additions include coaching tips, 23 bowls (up from four), the ability to edit new plays, and the official Heisman Trophy award.

NCAA Football 2001 

NCAA Football 2001, released only for the PlayStation, featured University of Alabama running back Shaun Alexander on the cover.

This version included Create-a-player, Create-a-school, Custom League (up to eight teams, double round-robin, plus playoff), Custom Tournament (up to 16 teams, double elimination), as well as fully customizable Season/Dynasty schedules.  This was also the final installment which offered a playoff at the end of the season in dynasty mode (24 teams).

NCAA Football 2002 

NCAA Football 2002, released only for the PlayStation 2, featured Florida State quarterback and Heisman Trophy winner Chris Weinke on the cover.

This was the first version released for PlayStation 2; it lacked features (such as Custom League, Custom Tournament, and Create-a-school) that were present in the previous year's PlayStation edition.

The game featured a new Campus Cards rewards system, which allowed players to unlock special features in the game such as historical teams or special stadiums. It was also the first entry in the season to rank the top 25 teams in the nation.

NCAA Football 2003 

NCAA Football 2003, released for the PlayStation 2, Nintendo GameCube, and Xbox, featured University of Oregon quarterback Joey Harrington on the cover.

New features in this version included over 200 licensed fight songs, 3D cheerleaders and 144 different schools.

Dynasty mode was enhanced with the ability to redshirt a player and schedule non-conference games before each season. Trophies and awards, modeled after real-life college football awards, was another feature new to this version. Players could win trophies by playing games and could add them to a personal collection which is shown off in a trophy room. These awards include the Heisman, Coach of the Year and Bowl-specific trophies. The game featured 23 different rivalry trophies that were created to represent their real-life counterparts.

Create-A-School mode returned in this edition of the game after being absent from the previous year.
The game also featured a customizable interface for the first time. Player could choose their favorite teams and the game interface would be based around the team's fight song, mascot, logos and school colors.

NCAA Football 2004 

NCAA Football 2004, released for the PlayStation 2, Nintendo GameCube, and Xbox, featured University of Southern California quarterback and Heisman Trophy winner Carson Palmer on the cover.

This edition featured the return of gameplay modes seen in previous versions such as Dynasty Mode.

The College Classics mode was introduced in this version and allowed players to replay classic games in college football history. New tackling animations and more realistic zone defenses were also included.

NCAA Football 2005 

NCAA Football 2005, the last game in the series to have the full year on the cover and released for the PlayStation 2, Nintendo GameCube, and Xbox, featured University of Pittsburgh wide receiver Larry Fitzgerald on the cover.

This version introduced more fan interaction in the game. The home team's defense can incite the crowd to make noise, making it difficult for the offense to hear the quarterback's audibles. This feature, dubbed "home field advantage", allowed stadium influence and energy to swing a game's momentum if strong enough. The game ranked the "Top 25 Toughest Places to Play", which included famous stadiums such as Florida's "Swamp" and LSU's "Death Valley", where this feature would be felt more strongly.

The new "Match-Up Stick" feature allowed players to match up more experienced and skilled players on younger, less-talented ones to exploit matchup problems.

All Division I-A schools were included in the game along with more than 70 I-AA schools. Signature fan celebrations, such as the "Gator Chomp" and "Texas Hook 'Em Horns" were included.

NCAA Football 06 

NCAA Football 06 has features that include the Dynasty mode, wherein the player act as a team's head coach, both on and off the field. Aside from weekly games, the player also controls recruiting freshman for the next year's season; new to the 2006 version is in-season recruiting.

Another new feature in the 2006 game is the Race for the Heisman mode, in which the player takes on the role of a single player attempting to win the Heisman Trophy.  Race for the Heisman begins with the user selecting which position they want their character to be. The player then completes a workout for college scouts and you are offered scholarships to three different schools. The quality of football programs that offer scholarships depends on how well the player did in the workout. The player can either choose to accept one of the scholarships or walk on at any Division I school. After selecting what school to play for the player is automatically placed in the starting line up. Year after year the player's attributes increase depending on the previous seasons performance with the ultimate goal of winning the Heisman trophy.

Desmond Howard, a Heisman-winning player from the University of Michigan, is on the cover. This is a slight break in tradition as the NCAA Football series traditionally featured an NFL rookie on the cover of the game, with an action shot of him wearing his college jersey from the previous year. The game was released for the PlayStation 2 and Xbox.

NCAA Football 07 

NCAA Football 07 was released on July 18, 2006, and was the series' first release on both the Xbox 360 and PSP. University of Southern California running back and Heisman Trophy winner Reggie Bush is featured on the game's cover. FCS teams were not featured on next gen consoles, but were available still on previous gen consoles.

This version of the game utilized a feature called Turn the Tide, which consisted of a momentum meter on the score graphic at the top or bottom of the screen. A boost in momentum for a team would increase the performance of all players and boost their attributes by a varying amount.

This version also included spring drills, an update to the Race for the Heisman mode called Campus Legend (which plays more like NFL Superstar mode in Madden), ESPN integration, and a spring game in Dynasty and Campus Legend modes.

NCAA Football 08 

NCAA Football 08 was released on July 17, 2007. The cover athlete is Boise State University quarterback Jared Zabransky.

Some of the new features for this version include Leadership Control, which allows players who perform well to "lead by example" and control the action on the field and increase their sphere of influence by improving their players' personal ratings on each big play. The game also features a new and deeper recruiting system and an all-new Campus Legend mode. This was the first version of the game released on the PlayStation 3.

NCAA Football 09 

NCAA Football 09 was released July 15, 2008. It was released on all 7th generation consoles, including, for the first and only time, the Wii. The covers featured the following college football figures:
 PlayStation 2 — DeSean Jackson, wide receiver/return specialist, California
 PlayStation 3 — Matt Ryan, quarterback, Boston College
 PSP — Owen Schmitt, fullback, West Virginia
 Wii — Sparty, mascot, Michigan State
 Xbox 360 — Darren McFadden, running back, Arkansas

NCAA Football 10 

NCAA Football 10 was released on July 14, 2009. The covers feature the following former college players:
 PlayStation 2 — Brian Orakpo, defensive end/linebacker, Texas
 PlayStation 3 — Brian Johnson, quarterback, Utah
 PSP — Mark Sanchez, quarterback, USC
 Xbox 360 — Michael Crabtree, wide receiver, Texas Tech

This game also introduced a feature which had been in the NCAA Football series until NCAA Football 14.

Teambuilder was a feature accessed by the EA Sports Teambuilder website. This would be the replacement for Create-A-School.

Teambuilder's website was an online accessible mode, where teams that were made via the site could be downloaded by other users.

NCAA Football 11 

NCAA Football 11 was released on July 13, 2010. It was released on all next generation consoles, with the exception of the Wii. The cover athlete for all three versions is former Florida quarterback Tim Tebow.

This was the last version of the game released for the PlayStation 2, and the only version released for iOS.

NCAA Football 12 

NCAA Football 12 was released on July 12, 2011 on PS3 and Xbox 360. The cover athlete was Mark Ingram II of the University of Alabama.

NCAA Football 13 

NCAA Football 13 was released on July 10, 2012. The game's cover features Heisman Trophy winner Robert Griffin III of Baylor, along with another Heisman winner (Barry Sanders from Oklahoma State), who was decided by fan voting. Sanders was picked over Marcus Allen, Doug Flutie, Desmond Howard, Charlie Ward, Andre Ware, Eddie George, and Herschel Walker during the voting process.

NCAA Football 14 

NCAA Football 14, the final installment in the series, was released on July 9, 2013. The game's cover features former Michigan quarterback   Denard Robinson, who was decided by fan voting. Robinson was picked over Eddie Lacy, Kenjon Barner, Jarvis Jones, EJ Manuel, Ryan Swope, John Simon, and Tyler Eifert during the voting process.

Cover Athletes

Future of the series 
Due to recent legal disputes between the association, Electronic Arts, college athletes, and others regarding the usage of college athletes' likenesses in video games (which is currently barred by the NCAA because of the concept of sport amateurism), they would not renew their licensing deal with EA. However, the expiration of the license only affects the use of the NCAA's trademarks in the games; teams and other events are licensed from schools individually or through organizations such as the Collegiate Licensing Company—who announced on the same day that they would extend its own licensing deal with EA through 2017. As such, EA ensured that with these existing deals in place, it would still be able to produce future versions of the franchise without the NCAA license (as it did prior to 1997); EA Sports' executive vice president Andrew Wilson announced that the next edition of the franchise was already in development, and would "[still] feature the college teams, leagues, and all the innovation fans expect from EA Sports."

However, after the SEC, Big Ten, and Pac-12 conferences announced that they would not license their trademarks to EA, the company announced on September 26, 2013 that it would not make a college football game for 2014. EA had plans to continue the series with a focus on user-generated content under the old College Football name, but the planned game was eventually canceled.

As of 2021, the series has not returned, although Oregon and Texas licensed their team names for the story mode in Madden NFL 18. Madden NFL 20 includes 10 licensed college teams for its new career storyline QB1: Face of the Franchise.

NCAA Football 14, the last edition of the game, continues to be played by fans, including actual college football players. Unofficial updates have been released to reflect current rosters. On October 29, 2019 the NCAA's board of governors voted unanimously to institute new rules allowing student athletes to profit from the use of their name, image, and likeness. The changes are set to take effect no later than January 2021. This development has caused many to speculate that a new NCAA Football game will be released in the near future.

EA Sports College Football 
On February 2, 2021, EA Sports announced that the series NCAA Football would return under the name EA Sports College Football, stating on Twitter, "For those who never stopped believing...College Football is coming back." They also released a statement on their website announcing that they had garnered and are utilizing a partnership with the Collegiate Licensing Company, an NCAA licensing group, to bring uniforms, stadiums, traditions and more from over 100 NCAA-affiliated sports teams. Player names and likenesses will not be included in the game. The deal will mean that teams not a part of the CLC will not be in the game such as Air Force, Army, Georgia State, Kentucky, New Mexico, Notre Dame, Troy and USC. On February 23, 2021 it was reported that Notre Dame will join the game if new rules that determine whether athletes will be able to receive a cut of the game's profits are finalized. Following similar statements from Tulane and Northwestern, EA Sports responded by stating "player name, image and likeness is not currently planned for the game. However, we are watching the developments in this area closely and are prepared to take steps to include players should that opportunity arise." The NCAA has delayed and not voted on the NIL rule as of now, but over two dozen states have either passed or proposed laws so that institutions can't enforce the NCAA's current NIL rules. EA Sports has been watching the development of the game closely and will release more information on the development and future of the franchise when they can.

The game, which was not under development prior to EA Sports' announcement of the new title, will be developed in Orlando, Florida by EA Tiburon. The company claimed that a revival of the NCAA Football franchise was one of their most requested games as of the time of their announcement of EA Sports College Football, and The Motley Fool projects that College Football sales could rival those of that year's Madden release. However, doubts have been raised as to whether or not the game's reception will exceed that of recent Madden releases, which are held in low regard by the Madden gaming community.

On November 22, 2022, in an interview with ESPN.com's Michael Rothstein, EA Sports vice president and general manager Daryl Holt stated that Electronic Arts would release the game sometime in summer 2024. "That's the best date for us to bring the game that we think is going to meet or exceed our player expectations...and cover the breadth and scale of what we want in the game. We're trying to build a very immersive college football experience," Holt said.

Player names 

Players' real names and specific likenesses are not used in the game. While the Madden NFL series does use real player names and likenesses,compensated for the use of their image. Due to current NCAA restrictions on the amateur status of athletes, names are not allowed. Additionally, current college players cannot be used as cover athletes. Instead, each cover features a player whose college eligibility ended the season before the game's release, wearing his former college uniform. The only two exceptions have been the Wii version of NCAA Football 09, which featured Sparty, the mascot of Michigan State University, on the cover, and NCAA Football 06 when Desmond Howard was featured on the cover striking the Heisman Trophy pose during his career at Michigan, despite not having played for Michigan for more than 15 years.

Although EA Sports does not claim that the players in the game represent real life players, the jersey number, position, height, weight, home state, and ethnicity are aligned with the real players. Fans of any particular team are sure to recognize their favorite players (for example, in NCAA Football 14, Florida State QB #5 would correspond to Jameis Winston). Actual usage of a player's real name would be in violation of the NCAA's policy regarding student athletes. Amateur "roster makers" will often manually associate player names and will upload a roster file to the built-in roster sharing system.  As of NCAA Football 09, EA has put in the EA Locker feature which allows remote roster sharing online through either Xbox Live or PlayStation Network depending on the console. In certain game modes, real players are given fake names. For instance, in NCAA Football 14, Ohio State QB Braxton Miller is referred to as Matthew Carrington. Due to new NIL Rules players will be able to have their names in the game. Though some players might not allow the use of their name or demand payment to be put into the game.

Soundtracks 
Prior to the release of NCAA Football 06, the only music featured in the game were fight songs of most FBS and FCS colleges featured in the game. These would play at random, however the user-selected "favorite team" would always have their fight song played first whenever the game was first started.

NCAA Football 06 was the first and only entry in the series to include licensed music to keep the series in uniform with other EA Sports releases of the time, such as Madden NFL and the NHL series.

NCAA Football 07 returned to the fight song only format.

NCAA Football 08 added a cinematic theme song to the main menu, with fight songs playing during Dynasty Mode.

NCAA Football 09 allows a new custom stadium sounds feature allowing users to edit what sounds are heard at specific stadiums during events within the game, such as a touchdown, field goal, or timeout. Fans of the teams can now create an authentic experience in each stadium by using copyrighted songs that EA is not allowed to put into the game.

NCAA Football 10 plays ”Tick Tick Boom” by The Hives in the introduction only.

NCAA Football 11 uses the music that is used in ESPN College Football coverage.

See also
Madden NFL

References

External links 
 Official website (archived, 4 Apr 2014)

College football video games
Electronic Arts franchises
Electronic Arts games
Video game franchises
EA Sports games

Video game franchises introduced in 1993